Bindura is one of seven districts in the Mashonaland Central province of Zimbabwe.  The district capital is the town of Bindura.

Settlements 
 Matepatepa

References

Bindura
Districts of Mashonaland Central Province